Ferdinando Meglio (born 27 June 1959) is an Italian fencer. In the team sabre events he won a gold medal at the 1984 Summer Olympics, a silver at the 1980 Summer Olympics and a bronze at the 1988 Summer Olympics.

References

External links
 
 

1959 births
Living people
Italian male fencers
Olympic fencers of Italy
Fencers at the 1980 Summer Olympics
Fencers at the 1984 Summer Olympics
Fencers at the 1988 Summer Olympics
Fencers at the 1992 Summer Olympics
Olympic gold medalists for Italy
Olympic silver medalists for Italy
Olympic bronze medalists for Italy
Olympic medalists in fencing
Fencers from Naples
Medalists at the 1980 Summer Olympics
Medalists at the 1984 Summer Olympics
Medalists at the 1988 Summer Olympics
Universiade medalists in fencing
Universiade bronze medalists for Italy
Medalists at the 1987 Summer Universiade